Hopea pedicellata is a tree in the family Dipterocarpaceae. The specific epithet pedicellata, refers to the species' prominent pedicel (flower stalk).

Description
It has buttresses and stilt roots. The bark is smooth.

Distribution and habitat
Hopea pedicellata is native to Thailand, Peninsular Malaysia, Singapore and Borneo.

Conservation
Hopea pedicellata has been assessed as endangered on the IUCN Red List. It is threatened by land conversion for agriculture. The species is found in some protected areas.

References

pedicellata
Flora of Borneo
Flora of Peninsular Malaysia
Flora of Singapore
Flora of Thailand
Taxonomy articles created by Polbot